The Motorola ATRIX 2 is a high end Android-based smartphone by Motorola. Originally announced on October 11, 2011, it is the successor to the Atrix 4G. This phone was succeeded by the Motorola Atrix HD.

Features
The Motorola Atrix 2 has a one-gigahertz dual core Texas Instruments OMAP processor with 1GB of RAM and 8GB of internal storage. It has a 4.3" display with a resolution of 960 by 540. Unlike its predecessor, the Atrix 2 does not use the PenTile matrix. The phone runs Android 2.3. An announced update to Android 4.0.4 has been pushed out over OTA  on October 9, 2012 in the United States. This phone supports AT&T's HSPA+ network.

Webtop
Similarly to the Atrix 4G, the Atrix 2 features Motorola's Webtop software, which allows the use of an Ubuntu-based desktop environment to browse the internet using Firefox, manage files, and access applications on the phone itself through a Mobile View window.

Upon the upgrade to Android 4.0, the Webtop mode was changed to use Android's built-in interface for tablets instead of a separate operating system environment, allowing direct use of apps already present on the device (which sometimes offer layouts optimized for larger displays).

See also
 Motorola Atrix 4G
 Droid Bionic, a similar phone by Motorola
 List of Android devices

References

External links

Android (operating system) devices
Linux-based devices
Motorola smartphones
Mobile phones introduced in 2011
Discontinued smartphones